The Angelini Tower is a 29-story residential skyscraper located in the city of Maracaibo, Zulia state, Venezuela.

It is the tallest building in the city and the Zulia state, having a height of 113 meters.

External links
 

Skyscrapers in Venezuela
Buildings and structures in Maracaibo
Residential skyscrapers
Residential buildings completed in 2009